Se ei olekaan niin (in English: But It's Not Like That) is the fourth studio album by Finnish pop rock singer-songwriter Maija Vilkkumaa. Released by Warner Music in Finland on 11 July 2005, it debuted at number one the Finnish Albums Chart and charted for 26 weeks. The album has sold over 47,000 copies to date in Finland, which has granted it a platinum certification.

Singles
The (rough) English translations of the tracks are in the brackets.
"Se ei olekaan niin" (But It's Not Like That)
"Kesä" (Summer)
"Liian kauan" (Too long)

Track listing
The (rough) English translations of the tracks are in the brackets.
Digital download

Charts and certifications

Weekly charts

Year-end charts

Certifications

References

2005 albums
Maija Vilkkumaa albums
Finnish-language albums